Bermuda Run is a town in Davie County, North Carolina, United States. The population was 1,725 at the 2010 census. It was incorporated in 1999 as a fully gated residential community near country clubs and golf courses like the Bermuda Run Country Club, Oak Valley Golf Club, and Tanglewood Park. In 2000, the town annexed into neighboring Hillsdale, picking up a commercial district. The town rests on the western bank of the Yadkin River along U.S. Route 158 and North Carolina Highway 801. Interstate 40 provides express access to Winston-Salem, the town's nearest urban center. In 2012, Kinderton Village was voluntarily annexed by the town of Bermuda Run.

History

Win-Mock Farm Dairy was listed on the National Register of Historic Places in 2010.

Geography
Bermuda Run is located in northeastern Davie County at  (35.998557, -80.431377). It is bordered to the northeast, across the Yadkin River, by the village of Clemmons in Forsyth County. Interstate 40 accesses the town from Exit 180 and leads northeast  to Winston-Salem and southwest  to Statesville.

Demographics

2020 census

As of the 2020 United States census, there were 3,120 people, 1,128 households, and 710 families residing in the town.

2000 census
As of the census of 2000, there were 1,431 people, 734 households, and 497 families residing in the town. The population density was 1,087.6 people per square mile (418.6/km2). There were 828 housing units at an average density of 629.3/sq mi (242.2/km2). The racial makeup of the town was 98.95% White, 0.49% African American, 0.07% Native American, 0.07% Pacific Islander, and 0.42% from two or more races. Hispanic or Latino of any race were 1.82% of the population.

There were 734 households, out of which 10.5% had children under the age of 18 living with them, 64.4% were married couples living together, 2.7% had a female householder with no husband present, and 32.2% were non-families. 30.1% of all households were made up of individuals, and 20.0% had someone living alone who was 65 years of age or older. The average household size was 1.93 and the average family size was 2.32.

In the town, the population was spread out, with 9.6% under the age of 18, 1.9% from 18 to 24, 11.9% from 25 to 44, 35.5% from 45 to 64, and 41.0% who were 65 years of age or older. The median age was 60 years. For every 100 females, there were 86.3 males. For every 100 females age 18 and over, there were 84.5 males.

The median income for a household in the town was $84,187, and the median income for a family was $100,727. Males had a median income of $100,000 versus $27,350 for females. The per capita income for the town was $47,765. None of the families and 1.4% of the population were living below the poverty line, including no under eighteens and 1.2% of those over 64.

References

External links
 
 Bermuda Run History

Bermudian American
Towns in Davie County, North Carolina
Towns in North Carolina
Populated places established in 1999
1999 establishments in North Carolina